The 2013–14 Fresno State Bulldogs men's basketball team represented California State University, Fresno during the 2013–14 NCAA Division I men's basketball season. This was head coach Rodney Terry's third season at Fresno State. The Bulldogs played their home games at the Save Mart Center and they were members of the Mountain West Conference. They finished the season 21–18, 9–9 in Mountain West play to finish in a tie for fifth place. They lost in the quarterfinals of the Mountain West Conference tournament to New Mexico. They were invited to the College Basketball Invitational where they advanced to the best of 3 finals where they lost to Siena 1 games to 2.

Departures

Recruiting

Roster

Schedule and results
Source

|-
!colspan=9 style="background:#FF0000; color:#000080;"| Exitbition

|-
!colspan=9 style="background:#FF0000; color:#000080;"| Regular season

|-
!colspan=9 style="background:#FF0000; color:#000080;"| Mountain West tournament

|-
!colspan=9 style="background:#FF0000; color:#000080;"| CBI

References

Fresno State
Fresno State Bulldogs men's basketball seasons
Fresno State
Fresno
Fresno